Pierre Bourquenoud (born 21 November 1969 in Vaulruz) is a Swiss former professional road cyclist. His sporting career began with VC Pedale Bulloise.

Major results

1997
 3rd Overall 3-Länder-Tour
1999
 2nd Grand Prix Winterthur
2000
 1st Grand Prix Winterthur
 3rd Tour du Doubs
 5th Tour de Berne
2001
 2nd Road race, National Road Championships
 2nd Grand Prix Winterthur
 3rd Tour du Jura
2002
 1st Stage 12 Vuelta Ciclista de Chile
 2nd Tour du Doubs
 2nd Tour de la Somme
 3rd Road race, National Road Championships
 5th Trophée des Grimpeurs
 6th Tour du Lac Léman
2003
 4th GP de Denain
 7th Classique des Alpes
 9th Overall Route du Sud

References

1969 births
Living people
French male cyclists